These are the Billboard magazine number-one albums of 1993, per the Billboard 200.

Chart history

See also
1993 in music
List of number-one albums (United States)

References

1993
1993 record charts